The following is a list of notable deaths in February 1966.

Entries for each day are listed alphabetically by surname. A typical entry lists information in the following sequence:
 Name, age, country of citizenship at birth, subsequent country of citizenship (if applicable), reason for notability, cause of death (if known), and reference.

February 1966

1 

 Roswell M. Austin, American politician and attorney; Speaker of the Vermont House of Representatives (b. 1887)
 Charles Belden, American photographer (b. 1887)
 Stuart Campbell, British journalist and editor (b. 1908)
 Arthur Curle, British cricketer (b. 1895)
 Gen. John D'Arcy, British Army officer (b. 1894)
 William Harrigan, American actor (b. 1894)
 Hedda Hopper, American gossip columnist (b. 1885)
 Buster Keaton, American actor and film director (b. 1895)
 Joseph R. Knowland, American politician and newspaper publisher (b. 1873)

3 
 Gianni Di Venanzo, Italian cinematographer (b. 1920)
 Cowboy Hill, American football player (b. 1899)
 Jack Keily, Australian rules footballer (b. 1898)
 Kamil Abdul Rahim, Egyptian diplomat (b. 1897)
 June Walker, American actress (b. 1900)

4 
 Lucius Beebe, American author and syndicated columnist (b. 1902)
 Ady Berber, Austrian film actor (b. 1913)
 Sir Lance Brisbane, Australian businessman (b. 1893)
 Irvin Brooks, American baseball player (b. 1891)
 Charles Comber, Australian rules footballer (b. 1891)
 Howard Dea, Canadian ice hockey player (b. 1891)
 Robert Graf, German actor (b. 1923)
Gilbert Hovey Grosvenor, Ottoman Empire-born American and Canadian journalist (editor of National Geographic Magazine) (b. 1875).
 Harold Hayman, British politician, MP (b. 1894)

5 
 Ludwig Binswanger, Swiss psychiatrist, pioneer in existential psychology (b. 1881)
 John Breen, Australian politician, Member of the Australian House of Representatives (b. 1898)

6 
 Paul Bardal, Canadian politician, member of the Legislative Assembly of Manitoba (b. 1889)
 Wayne G. Borah, United States federal judge (b. 1891)
 Narcisa de Leon, Filipino film mogul (b. 1877)
 Abdurrahman Nafiz Gürman, Turkish general (b. 1882)
 Algot Haquinius, Swedish pianist and composer (b. 1886)
 Vilis Lācis, Latvian writer and Soviet politician (b. 1904)
 Narcisa de León, Filipino film producer (b. 1877)

7 
 Bill Dole, American football coach (b. 1909)
 James A. Gardner, American soldier, Medal of Honor recipient (b. 1943)
 Leopold van der Pals, Russian-born Dutch composer (b. 1884)

8 
 Vernon Andrade, American jazz bandleader active primarily in New York City in the 1920s and 1930s (b. 1902)
 William L. Clayton, American Under Secretary of State (b. 1880)
 James Creese, American academic administrator (b. 1896)
 Paul Sophus Epstein, Polish-born Russian-American mathematical physicist (b. 1883)
 Karl Kangas, Finnish wrestler, competed at the 1912 Summer Olympics (b. 1886)
 Juho Karvonen, Finnish politician, MP (b. 1888)

9 
 Bruno Ahlberg, Finnish boxer, Olympic athlete (1932 and 1936) (b. 1911)
 Giovanni Benfratello, Italian fencer, competitor at the 1912 Summer Olympics (b. 1888)
 Budd Fine, American actor (b. 1894)
 Ignacio Hidalgo de Cisneros, Spanish aviator during the Spanish Civil War (b. 1896)
 Sophie Tucker, American singer (b. 1884)

10 
 Theodor Beckmann, German Luftwaffe officer during World War II (b. 1897)
 Bruno Bitkowski, Canadian all-star football centre (Ottawa Rough Riders) (b. 1929)
 Ryan DeGraffenried, Sr., American politician, member of the Alabama House of Representatives (b. 1925)
 William Dillon, American songwriter (b. 1877)
 Adm. Sir John Edelsten, British Royal Navy admiral (b. 1891)
 Gen. J. F. C. Fuller, British Army general during World War I (b. 1878)
 Mary Agnes Hamilton, British politician, MP (b. 1884)
 Osie Johnson, American musician (b. 1923)
 Billy Rose, American composer and band leader (b. 1899)

11 
 Reginald Boden, English cricketer (b. 1884)
 Fred E. Busbey, American politician, U.S. Representative from Illinois (b. 1895)
 Victor-Stanislas Chartrand, Canadian politician, member of the Legislative Assembly of Quebec (b. 1887)

12 
 Leon Beer, Australian rules footballer (b. 1903)
 Oswald Lewis, British politician, MP (b. 1887)

13 

 Roy Crisp, Australian rules footballer (b. 1890)
 Calle Jularbo, Swedish accordionist (b. 1893)
 Marguerite Long, French pianist (b. 1874)

14 
 Hugo Björne, Swedish actor (b. 1886)
 Germain Caron, Canadian politician, Member of the Legislative Assembly of Quebec (b. 1910)
 Charles Chellapah, Singaporean photojournalist (b. 1939)
 Jack Coffey, American baseball player (b. 1887)
 Adrian Cole, Australian Air Vice Marshal (b. 1895)
 François Demol, Belgian footballer (b. 1895)
 Ernest Albert Egerton, English soldier, recipient of the Victoria Cross (b. 1897)
 Charles Elsey, British race horse trainer (b. 1882)
 Jørgen Gudmundsen-Holmgreen, Danish sculptor (b. 1895)
 Walter Layton, 1st Baron Layton, British economist, newspaperman, and politician (b. 1884)

15 
 James B. Allardice, American television comedy writer of the 1950s and 1960s (b. 1919)
 Spence Burton, American-born Anglican bishop of Nassau, Bahamas (b. 1881)
 Gerard Ciołek, Polish architect and historian of gardens (b. 1909)
 Hedwig Conrad-Martius, German phenomenologist and mystic (b. 1888)
 Armando Fizzarotti, Italian screenwriter and film director (b. 1892)
 Camilo Torres Restrepo, Colombian priest and guerrilla leader (b. 1929)

16 
 Georgi Belev, Bulgarian opera singer (b. 1908)
 Paul Henri Bouffard, Canadian politician, member of the Senate of Canada (b. 1895)
 John Thomas Davies, English Anglican priest (b. 1881)
 Károly Escher, Hungarian photographer (b. 1890)
 Gwendolen Guinness, Countess of Iveagh, Anglo-Irish aristocrat and politician, MP (b. 1881)

17 
 Archibald Acheson, 6th Earl of Gosford, British nobleman (b. 1911)
 Siegmund Beutum, Austrian chess master (b. 1890)
 Syd Carman, Australian rules footballer (b. 1901)
 Chen Shutong, Chinese politician (b. 1876)
 Mike Chornohus, Austria-Hungary-born Canadian politician, member of the Legislative Assembly of Alberta (b. 1888)
 Charles Hobson, Baron Hobson, British politician, MP (b. 1904)
 Hans Hofmann, German-born American painter (b. 1880)
 Frank Joy, English cricketer (b. 1880)
 Gail Kane, American actress (b. 1885)

18 
 Mary Patricia Anderson, New Zealand politician, one of the first two women appointed to the New Zealand Legislative Council (b. 1887)
 Heinz Baader, German Luftwaffe officer during World War II (b. 1916)
 James Harry Beatty, Canadian politician, member of the Legislative Assembly of British Columbia (b. 1890)
 Rick Bockelie, Norwegian sailor, gold medalist at the 1924 Summer Olympics (b. 1902)
 Carol Ann Drazba, American military nurse killed in Vietnam War (b. 1943)
 Daniel D. Fernández, American soldier, recipient of the Medal of Honor (b. 1944)
 Frank Lukis, Australian air force commodore (b. 1896)
 Stanisław Mackiewicz, Russian-born Polish politician, Prime Minister of Poland (government in exile) (b. 1896)
 Robert Rossen, American film director (b. 1908)

19 
 Harry Geisel, American baseball umpire (b. 1888)
 James Edward Grant, American writer (b. 1905)
 Gilder D. Jackson Jr., American Marine Corps general (b. 1893)
 Max Leslie, Australian rules footballer (b. 1922)
 Arthur Lockwood, British politician (b. 1883)

20 
 Solomon Asch, Polish gestalt psychologist and pioneer in social psychology in the United States (b. 1907)
 Fernand Francell, French opera singer and actor (b. 1880)
 Chester Gore, American art director (b. 1893)
 Louise Guthrie, South African botanist (b. 1879)
 Johnny Hart, Australian rules footballer (b. 1888)
 Pop Laval, American photographer (b. 1882)
 Chester W. Nimitz, American admiral (b. 1885)

21 
 Harold Glanville (junior), British politician (b. 1884)
 Guy Jackson, English cricketer (b. 1896)

22 
 Everitt P. Blizard, Canadian-born American nuclear physicist and engineer (b. 1916)
 Bernard Braskamp, American Presbyterian minister, Chaplain of the United States House of Representatives (b. 1887)
 Georg Erdmann, Norwegian sports shooter, competed in the 1908 Summer Olympics (b. 1875)
 Melchor Fernández Almagro, Spanish writer, historian and journalist (b. 1893)
 Joseph Kiwánuka, Ugandan Roman Catholic Archbishop of Rubaga (b. 1899)

23 
 Billy Kyle, American pianist (b. 1914)

24 
 Jean d'Esme, French writer (b. 1894)
 Frederick Gentle, British judge (b. 1892)
 Billy Hampson, British football player and manager (b. 1882)
 William Major, Canadian politician, member of the House of Commons of Canada (b. 1896)

25 
 Garland Braxton, American baseball player (b. 1900)
 Ira Delbert Cotnam, Canadian politician, member of the Canadian House of Commons (b. 1883)
 Melchor Fernández Almagro, Spanish writer (b. 1893)
 G. C. Foster, Jamaican sportsman (b. 1885)
 Victor Kravchenko, Russian-born American writer (b. 1905)

26 
 José María Albareda, Spanish scientist, Secretary General and head of the Higher Council of Scientific Research (CSIC) (b. 1902)
 Emiliano Chamorro Vargas, President of Nicaragua (b. 1871)
 Sir Guy Dain, English physician (b. 1870)
 Adm. Richard Bell Davies, British Royal Navy officer and recipient of the Victoria Cross (b. 1886)
 Les Davis, American football coach (b. 1900)
 Karl Jørgensen, Danish actor (b. 1890)
 Mientje Kling, Dutch actress (b. 1894)
 Walter König, Polish industrialist (b. 1903)
 Reg Mackey, Canadian ice hockey player (b. 1899)
 Gino Severini, Italian painter (b. 1883)

27 
 Curt Badinski, German Wehrmacht general during World War II (b. 1890)

28 
 Elliot See, American test pilot and NASA astronaut (b. 1927)
 Charles Bassett, American test pilot and NASA astronaut (b. 1931)
 Schamyl Bauman, Swedish film director (b. 1893)
 George Harrison Dunbar, Canadian politician, member of the Legislative Assembly of Ontario (b. 1878)
 Jonathan Hale, Canadian-born American actor (b. 1891)
 Léonie Keingiaert de Gheluvelt, Belgian feminist, first female mayor of a town in Belgium (b. 1885)

References

1966-02
February 1966 events